Gaúcho, more rarely called , is the Brazilian Portuguese term for the characteristic accent spoken in Rio Grande do Sul, Brazil's southernmost state, including its capital, Porto Alegre. It is heavily influenced by Spanish and somewhat influenced by Guarani, Hunsrückisch, Venetian and other native languages.

Phonology
Its phonology is heavily similar to Rioplatense Spanish, including its characteristics of the speaking syllabic rhythm, use of L-vocalization in the syllable coda, and little use of nasal vowels, basically restricted to the monophthong  and the diphthongs .

Grammar
However, use of the standard você is also not rare. The same feature also occurs in other dialects of Brazilian Portuguese.

Vocabulary

Regional differences
The Gaúcho dialect ranges in features as the western variations have stronger influence from Rioplatense Spanish and the eastern, especially the ones spoken in the Metropolitan Region of Porto Alegre, stronger influence of the Paulistano dialect, resulting in differing features depending on the region the dialect is spoken.

See also
 Gaucho
 Portuguese dialects
 Portuguese phonology

References

Brazilian Portuguese